Gilberto Milani (13 May 1932 – 30 October 2021) was an Italian Grand Prix motorcycle road racer. His best year was in 1969 when he finished ninth in the 500cc world championship. After his riding career had ended, Milani took on the role of racing team manager for the Aermacchi factory, which was then bought by Harley Davidson. Milani played a role in managing Walter Villa to three consecutive 250cc road racing world championships.

References 

1932 births
2021 deaths
Sportspeople from Milan
Italian motorcycle racers
250cc World Championship riders
350cc World Championship riders
500cc World Championship riders
Isle of Man TT riders